Ankit Nagendra Sharma (born 20 April 1991) is an Indian cricketer who plays for Puducherry in domestic cricket. He is a left-handed batsman and a slow left-arm orthodox bowler.

In the 2015–16 season of Ranji Trophy, Ankit was the second-highest wicket-taker for Madhya Pradesh, picking up 33 wickets in 9 matches. Ankit also took his career-best bowling figures of 7 for 91 against Andhra Pradesh in that season, helping his team to quarter-final stage.

He scored his first century (104 runs) playing for Madhya Pradesh at Indore against Baroda during Ranji Trophy 2017-18 session.

In January 2018, he was bought by the Rajasthan Royals in the 2018 IPL auction.

References

External links 
 

1991 births
Living people
Indian cricketers
People from Gwalior
Sunrisers Hyderabad cricketers
Deccan Chargers cricketers
Madhya Pradesh cricketers
Central Zone cricketers
Rising Pune Supergiant cricketers
Rajasthan Royals cricketers
Pondicherry cricketers